Yann Pivois (born 20 January 1976) is a French professional racing cyclist.

Career highlights

 2003: 3rd in Prix des Moissons (FRA)
 2003: 2nd in Boucles Catalanes (FRA)
 2004: 3rd in Les Boucles de l'Artois (FRA)
 2004: 3rd in General Classification Tour du Tarn-et Garonne (FRA)
 2004: 1st in Prix des Moissons (FRA)
 2005: 2nd in Tour du Doubs (FRA)
 2008: 2nd in General Classification La Tropicale Amissa Bongo (GAB)

External links

1976 births
Living people
French male cyclists
Place of birth missing (living people)